Burwan Assembly constituency is an assembly constituency in Murshidabad district in the Indian state of West Bengal. It is reserved for scheduled castes.

Overview
As per orders of the Delimitation Commission, No. 67 Burwan Assembly constituency (SC) covers Biprasekhar, Burwan I, Burwan II, Kharjuna, Kuli, Kurunnorun, Panchthupi, Sabaldaha, Sabalpur, Sahora and Sundarpur gram panchayats of Burwan community development block and Gadda, Jajan and Gundiria gram panchayats of Bharatpur I community development block.

Burwan Assembly constituency is part of No. 10 Baharampur (Lok Sabha constituency).

Members of Legislative Assembly

Election results

2011
In the 2011 election, Protima Rajak of Congress defeated her nearest rival Binoy Sarkar of RSP.

 

.# Swing calculated on Congress+Trinamool Congress vote percentages taken together in 2006. Considering the Congress vote percentage alone in 2006, the swing was +5.37%.

1977–2006
In the 2006 state assembly elections Biswanath Banerjee of RSP won the Barwan assembly seat defeating his nearest rival Arit Majumdar of Congress. Contests in most years were multi cornered but only winners and runners are being mentioned. Amalendralal Roy of RSP defeated Tapas Dasgupta of Congress in 2001. Debabrata Banerjee of RSP defeated Ali Hossain Mondal of Congress in 1996, and Sudip Mohan Ghosh Moulik of Congress in 1991. Amalendra Roy of RSP defeated Gadadar Ghosh of Congress in 1987, Ali Hossain Mondal of Congress in 1982, and Sunil Mohan Ghosh Moulik of Congress in 1977.

1951–1972
Sunil Mohan Ghosh Moulik of Congress won in 1972 and 1971. Amalendra Lal Roy of RSP won in 1969 and 1967. The Burwan seat was not there in 1962 and 1957. In independent India's first election in 1951 Burwan Khargram was a joint seat Satyendra Chandra Ghosh Moulik and Sudhir Mondal, both of Congress, jointly won the Burwan Khargram seat.

References

Assembly constituencies of West Bengal
Politics of Murshidabad district